Super Six , is a 2012 Sri Lankan coming-of-age sports comedy film directed and produced by Udara Palliyaguruge for Real Image Films. Music composed by Mahesh Denipitiya. It is the 1174th Sri Lankan film in the Sinhala cinema. It is a remake of the 2007 Tamil film Chennai 600028.

Plot

Super Six is based a group of friends who live in an enclosed apartment, crazy about nothing but cricket, thinking of playing in a six-a-side tournament. They do many things to keep their team as the best ever six-a-side team, but the mischievous behavior of each and every one causes problems within the team. After the joining of the rival team captain, Jude, the story takes an unexpected twist.

The lives of these mischievous youth with micro-politics and their fantasies are the main theme.

Cast
 Hemal Ranasinghe as Sanath
 Roshan Ranawana as Aravinda
 Aruni Rajapaksha as Sherien
 Saranga Disasekara as Jude
 Paboda Sandeepani as Sulo
 Maleeka Sirisenage as Priya
 Mahendra Perera as Madaya
 Pubudu Chathuranga as Bathiya
 Saman Ekanayake as Raghu
 Eranga Jeewantha as Sanjay
 Akalanka Ganegama as Aravinda's friend
 Suneth Chithrananda as Gayya
 Anton Jude as Minister
 Rodney Warnakula Commentator Rodney
 Priyantha Seneviratne Commentator Priyantha
 Sanath Gunathilake as Sanath's brother Preme
 Gamini Hettiarachchi as Jude's father
 Manike Attanayake as Sulo's mother
 Duleeka Marapana as Jude's mother
 Janesh Silva as Constable
 Chathura Perera as Constable
 Mihira Sirithilaka in uncredited role
 Sarath Kulanga as Begger
 Nandana Hettiarachchi as Barber
 Ananda Wickramage as Jayasundara
 D.B. Gangodathenna as Taddy
 Chithra Warakagoda as Jayasundara's wife
 Jeevan Handunnetti as Umpire
 Dasun Nishan in uncredited role
 Ranjan Ramanayake in special appearance for item song
 Anarkali Akarsha in special appearance for item song
 Sanath Jayasuriya in special appearance for item song

Soundtrack
The audio of the film was launched with twelve songs.

Specialty
It was shot in locations such as Sri Lanka, India and Malaysia. The film ranked as the highest budget Sinhala film in the cinema history, where the production cost is more than 990 lakhs of Sri Lankan rupees.

References

External links

Remakes of Sri Lankan films
2010s sports comedy films
Sri Lankan comedy films
2012 comedy films
2012 films
2010s Sinhala-language films